WKAJ (1120 AM) is a radio station licensed to and transmitting from Saint Johnsville, New York, United States.  The station had aired Westwood Oneʼs Real Country format up until late 2020. Currently WKAJ is simulcasting sister station WCSS's Good Time Oldies produced by Westwood One. WKAJ is owned by Cranesville Block Company, Inc. When it first signed on, it featured a classic hits format with the slogan "The Bigfoot".

References

External links
WKAJ's website

KAJ
Classic hits radio stations in the United States
Radio stations established in 2013
2013 establishments in New York (state)